Leonardo Carcamo (born 6 November 1965) is a Honduran judoka. He competed in the men's extra-lightweight event at the 1996 Summer Olympics.

References

External links
 

1965 births
Living people
Honduran male judoka
Olympic judoka of Honduras
Judoka at the 1996 Summer Olympics
Place of birth missing (living people)